Events from the year 1206 in Ireland.

Incumbent
Lord: John

Events
 Norman Bishop of Rochfort transfers the See of Meath from Clonard, where it had been since its foundation by Finnian of Clonard in 520, to Trim.

Deaths
Tomás Láidir Mac Coisdealbhaigh, Irish soldier and poet

References